Pniel is a settlement in Cape Winelands District Municipality in the Western Cape province of South Africa.

It is a settlement and United Congregational Church of Southern Africa (UCCSA) mission station between Stellenbosch and Franschhoek, established in 1843. The name is of biblical origin (Genesis 32:30), referring to the place where Jacob wrestled with God; it means ‘face of God’.

References

Populated places in the Stellenbosch Local Municipality
Populated places established in 1843
1843 establishments in the British Empire